Félix Brítez Román (born 24 March 1967 in Asunción, Paraguay) is a Paraguayan former footballer who played as a forward for clubs of Paraguay, Brazil and Chile. He was part of the Paraguay national team for the Copa America 1989.

Teams
 Cerro Porteño 1985–1987
 Internacional 1987
 Cerro Porteño 1988–1993
 Everton 1994–1995
 Cerro Porteño 1996–1998
 Deportivo Pesquero 1999

Honours
Cerro Porteño
 Paraguayan Primera División 1990, 1992 and 1996
 Paraguayan Primera División Torneo Apertura: 1996 and 1998 
 Paraguayan Primera División Torneo Clausura: 1997

References
 

1967 births
Living people
Sportspeople from Asunción
Paraguayan footballers
Association football forwards
Paraguay international footballers
1989 Copa América players
Cerro Porteño players
Everton de Viña del Mar footballers
Sport Club Internacional players
Chilean Primera División players
Paraguayan expatriate footballers
Paraguayan expatriate sportspeople in Brazil
Expatriate footballers in Brazil
Paraguayan expatriate sportspeople in Chile
Expatriate footballers in Chile
Paraguayan expatriate sportspeople in Peru
Expatriate footballers in Peru